Coia is an Italian, English & Scottish surname. Notable people with the surname include:

Angelo Coia (1938–2013), American football player
Dame Denise Coia (born 1952 died 2020), clinical psychiatrist
Emilio Coia (born 1911), artist and widely published caricaturist from Glasgow
Maximin Coia (born 1983), French pair skater
Paul Coia (born 1955), Scottish television presenter and continuity announcer

See also
Gillespie, Kidd & Coia, Scottish architectural firm famous for their application of modernism in churches and universities